William Lockwood  (born June 20, 1998) is an American professional ice hockey right winger for the Hartford Wolf Pack of the American Hockey League (AHL) as a prospect to the New York Rangers of the National Hockey League (NHL). He played college ice hockey for the University of Michigan. Lockwood was selected by the Vancouver Canucks in the third round, 64th overall, in the 2016 NHL Entry Draft.

Playing career
While playing for the US National Team Development Program during the 2015-16 season, Lockwood recorded 16 goals and 39 points in 79 games before he was drafted by the Vancouver Canucks in the NHL Entry Draft. He then played for the University of Michigan, where he earned the Hal Downes Trophy as the team's MVP and Dekers Club Award as the team's top rookie in his freshman year. During the 2019–20 season in his senior year, Lockwood served as team captain where he ranked second on the team in scoring, recording nine goals and 14 assists in 33 games.

Lockwood was selected 64th overall in the third round of the 2016 NHL Entry Draft by the Vancouver Canucks. He was selected higher than projected, with NHL Central Scouting ranking him 108th among North American skaters. On March 19, 2020, Lockwood signed an entry-level contract with the Canucks.

On February 25, 2023, Lockwood and a seventh-round pick in the 2026 draft were traded to the New York Rangers in exchange for Vitali Kravtsov.

International play

Lockwood helped the United States national under-18 team capture bronze at the 2016 IIHF World U18 Championships.

Lockwood was selected to the United States under-20 team for the 2018 World Junior Championships in Buffalo, New York, winning bronze. However, during the tournament he was injured and was projected to miss months to recover.

Career statistics

Regular season and playoffs

International

References

External links
 

1998 births
Living people
Abbotsford Canucks players
American men's ice hockey right wingers
Hartford Wolf Pack players
Ice hockey players from Michigan
Michigan Wolverines men's ice hockey players
USA Hockey National Team Development Program players
Utica Comets players
Vancouver Canucks draft picks
Vancouver Canucks players